The 2019 Malaysia Tri-Nation Series was a Twenty20 International (T20I) cricket tournament held in Malaysia.

The series took place from 24 to 29 June 2019. The participating teams were Malaysia, Maldives and Thailand. Papua New Guinea were also included in the original schedule for a quadrangular tournament, but later withdrew. The matches were played at the Kinrara Oval in Kuala Lumpur. Malaysia and Thailand both played their first matches with T20I status during this tournament, following the decision of the ICC to grant full Twenty20 International status to all its members from 1 January 2019. 
Maldives played three 20-over warm up matches against an MCA President XI side from 19 to 21 June 2019. On the penultimate day, Malaysia secured the title after their last fixture against Maldives finished in a no result. The fixtures were part of Malaysia's preparation for the Regional Finals of the 2018–19 ICC T20 World Cup Asia Qualifier tournament in July 2019. Maldives all-rounder Nilantha Cooray was named player of the series.

Squads

Tour matches

1st T20 match

2nd T20 match

3rd T20 match

Points table

Matches

References

External links
 Series home at ESPN Cricinfo

2019 in Malaysian cricket
Associate international cricket competitions in 2019
International cricket competitions in Malaysia
June 2019 sports events in Malaysia